HD 40979 is a triple star system in the northern constellation of Auriga. The combined brightness of this group lies below the typical limit of visibility to the naked eye at an apparent visual magnitude of 6.74. It is located at a distance of approximately 108 light years from the Sun based on parallax. The system is receding with a radial velocity of +32 km/s.

The primary, designated component A, is an F-type main-sequence star with a stellar classification of F7V. It is an estimated 2.51 billion years old and is spinning with a projected rotational velocity of 9.1 km/s. The star has 1.21 times the mass of the Sun and 1.26 times the Sun's radius. It has a higher metallicity than the Sun – what astronomers term the relative abundance of elements with a higher atomic number than helium. The star is radiating 1.96 times the luminosity of the Sun from its photosphere at an effective temperature of 6,077 K. As of 2002, there is one extrasolar planet known to be orbiting around this star.

It has 83% of the mass of the Sun. The star has an estimated 0.38 times the Sun's mass.

Planetary system 
In 2003, the detection of a giant planet orbiting the primary was announced. It was discovered using the radial velocity method, which allow selected orbital elements of this object to be determined.

See also 
 List of extrasolar planets

References

F-type main-sequence stars
Planetary systems with one confirmed planet
Circumstellar disks
3

Auriga (constellation)
Durchmusterung objects
040979
028767